John L. E. "Bud" Collier (September 6, 1904 – October 2, 1996) was an American politician in the state of California. He served in the California State Assembly as a Republican from 1946 to 1978. Collier represented the 54th district from 1946 to 1972 and the 61st district from 1972 to 1978, when he was defeated in the Republican primary.

Collier was born in Wetumpka, Alabama in 1904. He attended Occidental College and earned a Bachelor of Arts degree in economics in 1932. During World War II he served in the United States Army as a combat intelligence officer. Collier received military education at the Air Intelligence School in Pennsylvania and at the Prisoner of War Intelligence School in London, England.

References

External links

United States Army personnel of World War II
Members of the California State Legislature
1904 births
1996 deaths
20th-century American politicians
United States Army officers